Danubia is a region embracing the land on the banks of the Danube river.  

Danubia may also refer to:

 Danubia (minor planet), a minor planet
 Danubia, a book by Simon Winder about the Habsburg monarchy